The 1975 Sunderland Metropolitan Borough Council election was held on 1 May 1975. A third of the seats on the Council were up for election, with each of the 26 council wards returning one councillor by first-past-the-post. The election was held on the same day as other local elections.

Background 
The new Sunderland Metropolitan Borough Council had been formed following the Local Government Act 1972 - all councillors on the new council were elected in an all-up election in 1973. The order in which the councillors were elected in the 1973 election dictated their term serving, with third-place candidates in each ward serving two years and up for re-election in 1975. Labour had come out of the 1973 elections with a clear majority ahead of the Conservatives.

Election results 
Labour maintained a comfortable majority on the Council after the election, despite losing four seats. The Conservatives gained seats from Labour in Deptford and Pallion ward and Humbledon ward, whilst the Liberals took a seat from Labour in Houghton-le-Spring. An Independent Labour Party candidate took a seat from Labour in Silksworth.

The election resulted in the following composition of the Council:

References 

Sunderland City Council elections